Coleodesmium is a monotypic genus of worms belonging to the family Torquaratoridae. The only species is Coleodesmium karaensis.

The species is found in Arctic Russia.

References

Enteropneusta